

Brewer Fever (Song) 

Brewer Fever is the fight song of the Milwaukee Brewers. It was written in 1979 and played extensively at Milwaukee County Stadium during the Brewer's pennant season 1982. The song coincided with the team's advertising slogan during the time, "Brewer Fever- Catch It!", which would stay for much of the 1980s.

It was released locally as a single.

The song can be found here

Milwaukee Brewers
Major League Baseball fight songs
1979 songs
Songwriter unknown